Peter Nover (born 18 July 1949) is a German former professional footballer who played as a defender in the 2. Bundesliga, North American Soccer League and Mexican Primera División.

Career
Born in Holzheim, Rhineland-Palatinate, Nover began playing football with amateurs Itzehoer SV 1909. He turned professional with Regionalliga Südwest side 1. FC Saarbrücken before joining Bundesliga side Wuppertaler SV Borussia in 1973. He only made one DFB-Pokal appearance for Wuppertaler before leaving for second division side 1. FC Mülheim in 1974.

In 1976, Nover moved to the United States to play in the NASL. He played for the Boston Minutemen and Team Hawaii, returning to Germany after each season for stints with Bonner SC and Schwarz-Weiß Essen, before settling with the San Diego Sockers in 1978. The physically imposing defender was known for both his defensive and offensive abilities.

Nover finished his playing career with Club Atlas during the 1980–81 season.

References

External links
 
 Peter Nover at Ludwigspark.de 
 
 Peter Nover at NASL Jerseys

1949 births
Living people
People from Rhein-Lahn-Kreis
German footballers
Association football defenders
1. FC Saarbrücken players
Wuppertaler SV players
Bonner SC players
North American Soccer League (1968–1984) players
Boston Minutemen players
Team Hawaii players
San Diego Sockers (NASL) players
Atlas F.C. footballers
Liga MX players
2. Bundesliga players
German football managers
Bonner SC managers
German expatriate footballers
German expatriate sportspeople in the United States
Expatriate soccer players in the United States
German expatriate sportspeople in Mexico
Expatriate footballers in Mexico
Footballers from Rhineland-Palatinate